Q & A with Dean Martin is an album by Melbourne, Australia-based rock band Something for Kate. It is a re-release of the entire 1996 ....The Answer to Both Your Questions EP (Tracks 1 to 7) together with the "Dean Martin" single (Tracks 8 to 10), both of which were out of print and still in demand by fans. Despite a 50+ minute running time, Q & A with Dean Martin is considered to be a 'mini-album'.

Track listing 
"Subject to Change" – 3:21
"Higher Than You Think" – 6:03
"Tomorrow and the Next Day" – 3:59
"Picards Lament" – 3:27
"Slow" – 4:27
"Toothpaste" – 3:08
"Clint" – 5:19
"Dean Martin" – 4:37
"WW" – 4:03
"One Quarter of One Hour" – 14:49

Release history

2000 compilation albums
Something for Kate albums
Murmur (record label) albums